The 2021 NCAA Division I men's soccer season was the 63rd season of NCAA championship men's college soccer. After the 2020 NCAA Division I men's soccer season was disrupted by the COVID-19 pandemic, the 2021 season partially returned to normal. However, despite the development of several vaccines, the pandemic was still ongoing, which might have led to various local or regional disruptions. Also, many conferences did not fully return to their pre-COVID state, with several having changed postseason tournament formats.

The season began on August 27, 2021, and concluded on November 14. The season culminates with the 2021 NCAA Division I Men's Soccer Tournament, which was held from November 17 to December 12, with the four-team College Cup at WakeMed Soccer Park in Cary, North Carolina.

Changes from 2020

Coaching changes

New programs 
On November 27, 2017, it was announced that, in 2020, the Tritons of the University of California, San Diego, located in the San Diego district of La Jolla, would begin the transition from Division II to Division I as a member of the Big West Conference. This move was delayed by the Big west cancelling its season due to the COVID-19 pandemic.

On July 15, 2020, after months of consideration, the NCAA granted the highly unusual request of the University of St. Thomas to move directly from Division III to Division I. The school had already accepted an invitation to join the Summit League, and the Tommies entered Division I and Summit League competition in 2021.

Discontinued programs 
While no schools dropped men's soccer prior to the 2021 fall season, one conference discontinued its men's soccer league. The Sun Belt Conference had six men's soccer members in 2019–20, but lost all of them by the end of the 2020–21 school year. First, Appalachian State dropped men's soccer in May 2020, citing financial impacts from COVID-19. That July saw Howard announce that it would become an associate member of the Northeast Conference in six sports, with men's soccer being one of four sports moving in July 2021. In January 2021 the ASUN Conference announced three schools as incoming full members, including Sun Belt men's soccer associate Central Arkansas. The following month saw Coastal Carolina announce that it would become a single-sport member of Conference USA, joining another in-state associate member in South Carolina. This left Georgia Southern and Georgia State as the only remaining Sun Belt men's soccer programs, and those two schools announced they would move that sport to the Mid-American Conference in late May 2021.

Conference realignment

Other changes 
On May 7, 2021, the Mid-American Conference announced that conference tournaments in nine sports, including men's soccer, would be reinstated effective in 2021–22. These tournaments had been suspended in 2020–21 due to COVID-19 concerns.

Conference USA announced on June 14 that current MAC men's soccer associate West Virginia would join C-USA men's soccer in 2022–23.

On September 28, the Missouri Valley Conference announced that Belmont, a men's soccer member of the Southern Conference and full member of the Ohio Valley Conference (which sponsors soccer only for women), would become a full MVC member in 2022–23.

The American Athletic Conference, which had been rocked by the announcement that three of its most prominent members (Cincinnati, Houston, and UCF, with only UCF sponsoring men's soccer), reloaded on October 21 by announcing the arrival of six new members from C-USA, with three sponsoring men's soccer—Charlotte, Florida Atlantic, and UAB. These new members are expected to join in 2023.

C-USA would see further attrition by the end of the month, with the Sun Belt Conference announcing the arrival of three new members no later than 2023—reigning national champion Marshall, another men's soccer school in Old Dominion, and Southern Miss, which sponsors the sport only for women. During a Sun Belt press conference on November 1 at which Marshall was formally introduced, conference commissioner Keith Gill announced that the Sun Belt would reinstate the sport once all new members joined. At the time, it was expected that another men's soccer school, James Madison, would join from the Colonial Athletic Association; James Madison was confirmed as an incoming Sun Belt member on November 6. These arrivals gave the Sun Belt enough men's soccer teams for an automatic NCAA tournament bid. Media reports also indicated that the Sun Belt could be a men's soccer home for several programs that would be left behind should C-USA fold, either as a men's soccer conference or entirely. While C-USA would eventually announce the arrival of four new members effective in 2023, securing its future as an all-sports conference for the time being, only one of the new members, current ASUN Conference member Liberty, sponsors men's soccer.

Realignment would reach deeper into the ranks of Division I men's soccer in the following months. Loyola Chicago announced on November 16 that it would leave the MVC for the Atlantic 10 Conference effective in July 2022. On consecutive days in late January 2022, three men's soccer-sponsoring schools announced moves to other leagues. First, on January 25, the CAA announced the entry of three new members, two of which sponsor men's soccer, effective that July. The new men's soccer-sponsoring members are Monmouth, a member of the Metro Atlantic Athletic Conference, and Stony Brook, a member of the America East Conference which had played football in the CAA since 2013. The next day saw the MVC announce that UIC would join from the Horizon League, also in July 2022.

Season outlook

Preseason polls

Regular season

Standings

Postseason

Conference winners and tournaments 

 * = Ineligible, in transition from Division II

Major upsets 
In this list, a "major upset" is defined as a game won by an unranked team that defeats a ranked team, or a team ranked 10 spots lower than the other team.

All rankings are from the United Soccer Coaches Poll.

Early season tournaments 
Several universities hosted early season soccer tournaments.

Award winners

All-America teams

Major player of the year awards 
 Hermann Trophy: Dante Polvara, Georgetown
 TopDrawerSoccer.com National Player of the Year Award: Dante Polvara, Georgetown

Other major awards 
 United Soccer Coaches College Coach of the Year: Mike Noonan
 Bill Jeffrey Award: Lesle Gallimore
 Jerry Yeagley Award:
 Mike Berticelli Award: Deborah Raber
 NCAA Tournament MVP: Offensive: Isaiah Reid Defensive: George Marks

See also 
 College soccer
 List of NCAA Division I men's soccer programs
 2021 in American soccer
 2021 NCAA Division I Men's Soccer Tournament
 2021 NCAA Division I women's soccer season

References

 
NCAA